Ryan Carr (born 3 August 1988) is a rugby league football coach who is currently the assistant coach for the Parramatta Eels and former coach of the Featherstone Rovers.

Background
Carr played for the Wests Tigers in lower grades before signing with South Sydney Rabbitohs in 2012. Carr was expected to challenge Adam Reynolds for the vacant no.7 jersey left by Chris Sandow who signed with Parramatta. Carr never played in the NRL, suffering a career ending injury in NSW Cup he ventured into coaching.

Coaching
Carr moved into a backroom role with the South Sydney Rabbitohs and the Cronulla-Sutherland Sharks. In 2018, Carr was hired coach of Mounties in NSW cup, who were a feeder club to the Canberra Raiders. In his first season, Carr guided Mounties to the top 8, being knocked out in week two by Newtown.

In 2019, Carr was hired to coach the Featherstone Rovers in the Championship in England. Carr had a successful season with Featherstone, guiding them 5th place and making the semi's. Featherstone won three straight semi finals in a row, guiding them to a final promotion play-off with the Toronto Wolfpack, ultimately losing.

In 2020, Carr returned to Australia, hired as an assistant and NSW Cup coach with the Parramatta Eels.

After two COVID-19 affected seasons, Carr was named NSW Cup coach of Parramatta for 2022. Halfway through the 2022 season, after the departure of assistant David Kidwell to Argentina Rugby Union, Carr was named to replace Kidwell as assistant next to Brad Arthur.

References

External links
Rugby league project

1988 births
Featherstone Rovers coaches
Living people